Ettore Lo Gatto  (20 May 1890 – 16 March 1983) was an Italian linguist, literary historian, translator, critic and academic.

Life and career 
Born in Naples, Lo Gatto wrote his first novel, I misteri della Siberia, aged 13 years old. After graduating in law at the University of Naples Federico II, he followed some philosophy courses and then became interested in German studies, holding academic trips to Munich, Heidelberg, Bayreuth and Zurich and publishing translations of works by Friedrich Nietzsche, Richard Wagner and Hans Sachs.

During the World War I Lo Gatto was taken prisoner and interned in a camp in Sigmundsherberg, where he came into contact with Russian culture. After the war he knew a Russian teacher, Zoja Matveevna, who later became his wife and his closer collaborator. Starting from 1919 he started an intense activity of translation, cultural promotion and research in the field of Russian literature. In 1920 he founded the academic journal Russia, and one year later he founded and was the first secretary of the Istituto per l'Europa orientale (IPEO, Institute for Eastern Europe), and founded and directed the journal Europa orientale ("Eastern Europe").

Among Lo Gatto's major works, Poesia russa della rivoluzione ("Russian Poetry of the Revolution", 1923), Storia della letteratura russa ("History of Russian literature", seven volumes published between 1928 and 1944), Gli artisti italiani in Russia ("Italian artists in Russia", three volumes, 1934–1943), Storia del teatro russo ("History of Russian Theatre", 1952) Storia della letteratura russa contemporanea ("History of Contemporary Russian Literature", 1958–1968) and Storia della letteratura russa moderna ("History of Modern Russian Literature", 1960–1968).

Lo Gatto also had an important academic career, first as professor of Slavic literature in his alma mater, professor of Slavic philology at University of Padua, and later as professor of Russian language and literature for about 25 years at the Sapienza University of Rome. He was also  visiting professor of Italian literature at Charles University in Prague between 1936 and 1939.

In 1960 Lo Gatto won the Viareggio Prize for criticism with Pushkin, storia di un poeta e del suo eroe ("Pushkin, Story of a Poet and his Hero"). He was an  Academician of the Lincei from 1972 till his death in 1983.

References

External links 
 Ettore Lo Gatto at Open Library

1890 births
1983 deaths
People from Naples
20th-century Italian writers
20th-century Italian essayists
20th-century Italian translators
University of Naples Federico II alumni
Academic staff of the University of Padua
Academic staff of the University of Naples Federico II
Academic staff of the Sapienza University of Rome
Viareggio Prize winners